Omri Altman (born 23 March 1994) is an Israeli professional footballer who plays as an attacking midfielder for Cypriot side AEK Larnaca.

Early and personal life
Altman was born in Ramat Gan, Israel, to a family of Ashkenazi Jewish (Hungarian-Jewish) descent.

He also holds a Hungarian passport.

Club career

Early career at Maccabi Tel Aviv and Fulham
Altman joined the youth squad of Maccabi Tel Aviv at the age of 11. His good performances attracted interest from Premier League clubs and earned him a move to Fulham in 2011.

On 27 June 2013, Altman was loaned back to Maccabi Tel Aviv. On 17 July 2013, Altman made his first ever official appearance with the senior team of Maccabi in an important match against Győri ETO FC in the 2013–14 UEFA Champions League qualifying rounds. On 20 October 2013, he made his league debut in a 1–0 victory against Ironi Ramat Hasharon.

On 19 June 2015, he signed with Hapoel Tel Aviv for five years.

Panathinaikos
On 28 June 2017, Altman signed a three-year contract with Panathinaikos from Hapoel Tel Aviv for a transfer fee of approximately €150,000. On 17 September 2017, he scored with a header the only goal in a 1–0 home win against Apollon Smyrni.
The Israeli youth international was brought to the club as a virtual unknown from Hapoel Tel Aviv for a fee in the region of €150,000. This highlights the severe financial constraints impacting Marinos Ouzounidis. The attacking midfielder, however, has done relatively well barring an injury that kept him out for some time. His two goals in the first half of the season came in a home win against Apollon Smyrni and in a draw away against Xanthi.

On 4 March 2018, Panathinaikos' Israeli attacking midfielder, Omri Altman, suffered cruciate ligament injury during the away derby clash against Olympiacos and will miss the last six championship matches of the Greens and therefore the remainder of 2017-18 season. His return was initially pencilled in for September or October 2018, but it got delayed as he returned to his native Israel for further treatment. There had now been a new delay as Panathinaikos coach Giorgos Donis wants the midfielder to undergo a slow recovery process to ensure he is 100% fit before even being considered for the first team. The new return date is estimated to be January 2019, with heavier training commencing in December, that would make it 10 months on the sidelines for the 24-year-old. On 21 January 2019, after a very difficult period for the midfielder marred by injury (313 days to be exact) he returned to the squad in a 1–0 away loss against Lamia. On 16 February 2019, a month after his return he scored after a great pass from captain Dimitris Kourbelis and the Isralian chested the ball down superbly before firing a powerful shot beyond Nikos Papadopoulos from the edge of the penalty area, sealing a 1–0 home win game against Asteras Tripoli.

Return to Hapoel
On 14 July 2019, Altman returned to Hapoel Tel Aviv.

Arouca
In September 2021, Altman joined Portuguese club Arouca.

International career
Altman made his debut for the Israel national football team on 27 September 2022 in a friendly game against Malta.

Honours

Club
Maccabi Tel Aviv
Israeli Premier League: 2013–14

See also 
 List of Jewish footballers
 List of Jews in sports
 List of Israelis

References

External links
 
 

1994 births
Israeli Ashkenazi Jews
Living people
Israeli Jews
Israeli footballers
Hungarian Jews
Hungarian footballers
Citizens of Hungary through descent
Israeli people of Hungarian-Jewish descent
Jewish footballers
Association football midfielders
Fulham F.C. players
Maccabi Tel Aviv F.C. players
Hapoel Petah Tikva F.C. players
Hapoel Tel Aviv F.C. players
Panathinaikos F.C. players
F.C. Arouca players
AEK Larnaca FC players
Israeli Premier League players
Super League Greece players
Primeira Liga players
Footballers from Ramat Gan
Israel youth international footballers
Israel under-21 international footballers
Israel international footballers
Israeli expatriate footballers
Hungarian expatriate footballers
Expatriate footballers in England
Israeli expatriate sportspeople in England
Hungarian expatriate sportspeople in England
Expatriate footballers in Greece
Israeli expatriate sportspeople in Greece
Hungarian expatriate sportspeople in Greece
Expatriate footballers in Portugal
Israeli expatriate sportspeople in Portugal
Hungarian expatriate sportspeople in Portugal
Expatriate footballers in Cyprus
Israeli expatriate sportspeople in Cyprus
Hungarian expatriate sportspeople in Cyprus